The European Parliament election of 1999 took place on 13 June 1999. The Valdostan Union was by far the most voted party in Aosta Valley.

Results

Source: Ministry of the Interior

1999 elections in Italy
Elections in Aosta Valley
European Parliament elections in Italy
1999 European Parliament election